Eleanor Harrison (born 17 November 1977) is an English television presenter, best known for co-presenting Countryfile since 2009.

Early life
Born to a father who was a carpenter and a mother a midwife, Harrison grew up in rural Gloucestershire close to Cirencester, where the family grew their own fruit and vegetables and kept chickens. She was educated at Sir William Romney's School, Tetbury, and later Cirencester College for her A-levels.

While at university, she was in a relationship with Nathan Hutchings, son of actor Geoffrey Hutchings. Through his father, Hutchings had contacts in Zimbabwe from the shooting of the Clint Eastwood film White Hunter Black Heart, which allowed the couple to visit the country, where Harrison gained her interest in wildlife. She graduated from King's College London with a degree in Ecology and Geography in 2000.

Career
To support herself while exploring a career in country music, Harrison undertook a series of temporary jobs, ending up as a secretary at Channel 5. Picked from a line-up to host the children's show Milkshake!, she turned the job down, but a year later was chosen to fill in for Michaela Strachan's maternity leave, presenting Michaela's Wild Challenge for over a year, during which time the show won a children's BAFTA. Following this, she became a freelance television presenter, presenting on the BBC, ITV, Channel 4, Channel 5 and the Discovery Channel.

Harrison currently provides filmed reports or is a presenter on various TV shows, including: Countryfile, Country Tracks, The Great British Winter and The One Show for the BBC; and Daily Planet & Outrageous Acts of Science for the Discovery Channel.

In December 2014, Harrison took over as President of the Gloucestershire Wildlife Trust from Sir Henry Elwes.

Since 2015, she has co-presented Secret Britain on BBC One. In 2015, she presented Dinosaur Britain, a two-part documentary for ITV. In 2016, she presented Britain's Sharks and Britain's Whales, also for ITV. She appeared at Countryfile Live at Blenheim in August and Countryfile Ramble for Children in Need in Edinburgh, returning to Countryfile in November 2016 after maternity leave. In November 2017 she danced and sang as part of a special Countryfile country music routine for BBC's Children in Need.

Personal life
Harrison and Matthew Goodman were married in 2005, and they have two daughters and a son.

References

External links

1977 births
Living people
Place of birth missing (living people)
People from Cotswold District
Alumni of King's College London
English television presenters